Erskineville is an inner-city suburb of Sydney, in the state of New South Wales, Australia. It is located 6 kilometres south west of the Sydney central business district and is part of the local government area of the City of Sydney. Erskineville is a diverse suburb homing to a wide variety of ethnicity from its varying Southeast Europe and Aboriginal community. Erskineville is colloquially known as Erko.

Erskineville is bordered by the suburbs of Newtown to the west, Redfern to the north, St Peters to the south, and Alexandria to the east. The locality of Macdonaldtown sits over the north-west border.

Erskineville is a residential suburb. Erskineville Oval is located on the eastern border of the suburb.

History

The suburb was originally called after an earlier subdivision in 1846 in the south of Erskineville owned by Stephen Macdonald. The streets around the early Macdonaldtown subdivision are named after relations of the Macdonald family - Amy, Flora, Eve, Coulson and Rochford. Knight Street is named for Henry Knight, one of the earliest brickmakers in the district and the first mayor of Macdonaldtown. Devine Street is named for the first grant holder, Nicholas Devine, the first principal superintendent of convicts. He called his property Burren Farm, after a region of County Clare in his native Ireland.

Erskineville is named after Erskine Villa, the home of Wesleyan minister, Reverend George Erskine, built in 1830. After changing owners a few times, the property was eventually left to the Church of England and became the rectory for the Holy Trinity Church at Macdonaldtown (it was demolished in 1961 after serving as the rectory for eighty years).

The area was first incorporated on 23 May 1872, with the name of the "Municipal District of Macdonald Town" (but was variously known as the "Borough of Macdonald Town" or the "Municipality of Macdonaldtown"). On 19 July 1872, the first council, consisting of six aldermen in one electorate, was elected (Charles Brandling Henderson, Henry Knight, James Bryan, Alexander Swanson, William Irwin and James Heighington), with Henry Knight elected as the first mayor at the first meeting on 23 July 1872.

In 1893 Macdonaldtown was renamed as Erskineville, when the Parliament of New South Wales passed the "Borough of Erskineville Naming Act, 1893", effecting the municipal name change. In the late nineteenth century, the inhabitants were originally market gardeners, though brick making and tanning also became dominant industries. The Victorian cottages and small rows of Victorian terraces that dominate the built form of the suburb were the homes of the workers in these industries, which explains their smallness: a four-metre wide terrace is large by Erskineville standards.

In the early twentieth century, manufacturing in the area diversified, and Erskineville became a resolutely working class inner city suburb. In 1938 the Erskineville Public Housing Scheme was inaugurated on the western end of Erskineville Park, as an early response by the NSW Government to the Housing Improvement Act 1937 towards the problem of slum clearance in the inner city. From the 1970s, Erskineville underwent gentrification with new residents attracted to the village atmosphere, public transport links and the proximity to the CBD.
 
From the 19th century until the second half of the 20th century, the south-eastern section of Erskineville was taken up by large industrial uses. Bakewell Brothers brick and pottery works operated until 1956, and Metters Limited had a large factory that made items such as the "Kooka" stove operating from 1907 to 1974. Steelworks like McPherson’s Pty Ltd and Hadfields Steel Works also operated until the 1970s. The site of these industrial works were identified since 1998 as a site for urban renewal, with the land east of the rail line, south of Ashmore Street and north of Coulson Street known as the "Ashmore Estate". The Ashmore Estate is currently identified for major residential redevelopment as part of the urban renewal process.

Transport

Trams

The Erskineville line opened as an electric double track tramway in 1909. It branched from tracks at Regent Street in Chippendale, and passed west along Meagher Street, then south into Abercombie Street. It followed Abercrombie Street south across the junction with Cleveland Street through Golden Grove, before swinging south into Golden Grove Street then right into Wilson Street. The line then passed under the railway lines at Burren Street, adjacent to the entrance to Macdonaldtown railway station. The line then became a single track loop passing up Burren Street to Erskineville Road, then west along Erskineville Road to Septimus Street, then Albert Street before rejoining the tracks at Burren Street. Services operated from Circular Quay using the Pitt and Castlereagh Street lines. The line south of [Cleveland Street closed in 1940, with the northern section used by other services until its closure in 1958.

The Henderson Road line was a short line that branched from the Alexandria line tracks at the corner of Henderson and Mitchell Roads in Alexandria and passed along Henderson Road to Park Street in Erskineville, and later to Bridge Street adjacent to Erskineville railway station. Services operated from Circular Quay with the line opening to Park Street in 1906 and to Bridge Street in 1909. The line was an electrified single track throughout. The line was an early closure in 1933 and was replaced by a private bus service that no longer operates.

Trains and buses
Heavy rail was extended south from Central railway station to Erskineville between 1884 and 1893 via the Illawarra railway line. Today, Erskineville is served by the T3 Bankstown Line of the Sydney Trains network. Newtown railway station, Macdonaldtown railway station and St Peters railway station also service the suburb and are within close distance from the centre of Erskineville.

Buses provide a service from Marrickville Metro shopping centre at Marrickville to Surry Hills.

Popular culture
 The Imperial Hotel at Erskineville is the famous drag show pub featured in the movie Priscilla, Queen of the Desert.
 Erskineville and the Inner West area were featured in the indie film, Erskineville Kings, one of the last projects that Hugh Jackman worked on before he was offered the role of Wolverine in X-Men, henceforth becoming a Hollywood movie star.
 Famed retro hard rock band Wolfmother was raised and formed here.
 A poster traced back to the Cicada 3301 online puzzle was in this suburb.

Population

At the 2021 census, the population of Erskineville had risen to 9,657.

At the 2016 census, there were 8,014 residents in Erskineville. The most common reported ancestries were English 24.6%, Australian 17.0%, Irish 10.9%, Scottish 7.9% and Chinese 5.0%. 59.1% of people were born in Australia. The next most common countries of birth were England 7.2%, New Zealand 3.2% and China 2.5%.  74.6% of people spoke only English at home. Other languages spoken at home included Mandarin 2.5%, Spanish 1.5% and Cantonese 1.4%. The most common responses for religious affiliation were No Religion 54.8% and Catholic 14.1%.  On the day of the Census, 45.9% of employed people used public transport as at least one of their methods of travel to work and 28.1% used car (either as driver or as passenger). The main housing types were flats or units 55.3%, semi-detached or townhouses 40.2% and separate houses 3.5%. Just over half of residents (50.1%) were renting, compared with the national average of 30.9%.

Notable residents

 Stuart Challender, conductor, known for his work as chief conductor of the Sydney Symphony Orchestra.
 Jon Cleary, novelist
 Felix Dean, actor known for his recurring role as V. J. Patterson on soap opera Home and Away
 Myles Heskett, musician, member of Wolfmother
 Natalie Imbruglia singer and former actress
 Daniel Johns, member of Silverchair and The Dissociatives
 John Kennedy, singer/songwriter of King Street, Miracle (in Marrickville)
 Paul Mac, musician and DJ, member of The Lab, Itch-E and Scratch-E, The Dissociatives, and silverchair
 Jackie Orszaczky, musician, orchestrator, composer, bandleader
 John Prior, musician, composer and producer
 Chris Ross, musician, member of Wolfmother
 Andrew Stockdale, musician, member of Wolfmother
 Urthboy, Australian solo hip hop artist and member of The Herd
 David White, Academy Award-winning sound designer, known for his work on Mad Max: Fury Road (2015), Dark City (1998) and The Railway Man (2013).

Education
There are two schools within Erskineville itself, both catering for the primary-level (K–6):
Erskineville Public School, established 1883, is a public primary school on Swanson Street.
St Mary's Catholic Primary School, established 1887, is a private Catholic school and has been on its current site on Swanson Street since 1912.

In addition, Erskineville is serviced by several public secondary schools. The suburb itself is within the catchment-area of the Newtown High School of the Performing Arts, while Alexandria Park Community School (K–12), Marrickville High School and Tempe High School are the closest comprehensives.

Heritage

Heritage Conservation Areas
Erskineville is covered by HCAs in approximately 75% of its area. These include:
Burren Estate Heritage Conservation Area, covering the northern triangle of the suburb bounded with Newtown, including the Town Hall.
Toogood and White's Estate Heritage Conservation Area, located south of Erskineville Road to Victoria Street.
Former Macdonaldtown Heritage Conservation Area, covers the suburb from Munni Street south the Bray Street west of the rail line.
Pleasant Avenue Heritage Conservation Area, located south of the Former Macdonaldtown HCA between Rochford Street and Smiths Lane down to Macdonald Street.
King Street Heritage Conservation Area (part), shared with Newtown, is located in Erskineville south of Union Street and ends at Concord Street.
Erskineville Estate Heritage Conservation Area, covers the 1885 Macdonaldtown Parkand and the inter-war Erskineville Housing Scheme.
Malcolm Estate Heritage Conservation Area, covers the suburb east of the Station including the Public School, west of Binning Street and along Ashmore Street.
Kingsclear Road Heritage Conservation Area (part), shared with Alexandria, covers the suburb south of Railway Parade, west of Park Street and east of Sydney Street.

Items listed on the Sydney Local Environmental Plan
former Cosmopolitan Hotel (1880–1910), on 11 Charles Street, is a former hotel in the late Victorian style with a second floor added in the Federation Free Classical style c. 1910 designed by Lindsay Thompson.
former Bakewell Brothers south-east warehouse (now Brightwell Transport site; 1914–1919), on 7-19 Coulson Street, is a former warehouse of the Bakewell brick and pottery works listed in 2016 as a result of the 2014 City of Sydney Industrial and Warehouse Buildings heritage study.
Imperial Hotel (c. 1940), on 35-37 Erskineville Road, is an Inter War Functionalist style pub designed by Virgil Dante Cizzio.
Holy Trinity Anglican Church Group (1885–1961), on 55 Erskineville Road, includes the 1885 church designed by the Blacket brothers, sons of Edmund Blacket.
Erskineville Hotel (1940), on 102 Erskineville Road, is an Art Deco pub designed by Copeman, Lemont & Keesing.
Erskineville Town Hall (1938), on 104 Erskineville Road, was designed in the Inter-War Mediterranean style by Lindsay Scott and served as the seat of the Municipality of Erskineville until 1948 and the City of South Sydney until 2003.
The facade of the former St Peter's Theatre (1927), on 672 King Street, is the Federation Romanesque style facade remaining of the picture theatre designed by Emil Sodersten.
Former factory chimney stack (1916), on 127 Railway Parade, is a remnant chimney stack "significant for its connection to Australian manufacturing of hosiery and underwear during the 1920s and 1940s, gramophones and records in the 1920s and 1930s and textiles between the 1940s and 1980s." Listed in 2016 as a result of the 2014 City of Sydney Industrial and Warehouse Buildings heritage study
former Macdonaldtown Post Office (c. 1873), on the corner of Rochford and Knight Streets, was built by Henry Knight, a mayor of Macdonaldtown.
Erskineville Public School (from 1883), on 13 Swanson Street, was first designed by C.H.E. Blackmann and Varney Parkes, in the Victorian Free classical style.
Rose of Australia Hotel (1934), on the corner of Swanson Street and George Street, is an Inter War Free Classical style pub designed by Prevost and Ruwald.
St Mary's Catholic Church Group (1912), on 21-23 Swanson Street, was built in the Federation Arts & Crafts style as a memorial to Rev. Father Reginald Bridge, designed by J.McCarthy.
former Cleveland Shoe Company factory (1923), on 18-20 Victoria Street, is a former factory designed in the inter-war Chicagoesque style listed in 2016 as a result of the 2014 City of Sydney Industrial and Warehouse Buildings heritage study.

Items listed by NSW Government Agencies
Erskineville Railway Station Group (c. 1910–1913), is listed under the RailCorp heritage register and is also listed under the Sydney LEP.
Electricity Substation No. 101 (1919), on 1A Ashmore Street, is listed under the Ausgrid Heritage Register and is also listed under the Sydney LEP.

Gallery

See also
 Newtown area graffiti and street art

References

External links 

Ashmore Precinct Renewal Project

Suburbs of Sydney
City of Sydney